Silvergate Bank is a California bank founded in 1988. Planning to undergo liquidation procedures as of March 2023, the company began providing services for cryptocurrency users in 2016, and conducted an IPO in 2019. In November 2022, concerns were raised about Silvergate's health, following the fall in cryptocurrency prices and the bankruptcy of FTX. In March 2023, the bank announced plans to wind down and liquidate.

Foundation and growth
Silvergate Bank was founded as a savings and loan association. In 1996, it was re-capitalized and reorganized into a bank by Dennis Frank and Derek J. Eisele, but it initially remained a three-branch community bank in the San Diego region.

In 2013, CEO Alan Lane personally invested in Bitcoin; the company launched an initiative to start serving cryptocurrency clients in 2016. After this, the bank grew rapidly, reaching $1.9 billion in assets and 250 clients by 2017. The company conducted an IPO in November 2019 at a share price of $13, and by November 2021 the price had risen by 1,580% to $219 due to the cryptocurrency bubble at the time.

Silvergate Exchange Network and Diem acquisition 
The bank operated a real-time payments system called the "Silvergate Exchange Network" (SEN), which enabled cryptocurrency exchanges, institutions, and customers to exchange fiat currencies such as US dollars and Euros. Silvergate was probably the first regulated bank to develop this sort of payment system. By the third quarter of 2022 it had $12 billion in deposits from 1,677 "Silvergate Exchange Network" (SEN) customers including all major cryptocurrency exchanges and over 1,000 institutional investors.

In 2021, Silvergate initiated efforts to launch its own U.S. dollar-backed stablecoin, acquiring Meta's Diem technology in January, 2022 for around $200 million to assist with this (Silvergate had previously intended to serve as a key issuer of the Diem currency for Meta). As of late 2022, the stablecoin had not yet launched.

By this time, the bank was led by Lane as CEO and Ben Reynolds as president, while Eisele remained in the leadership as chief credit officer.

FTX exposure, drop in liquidity, and winding down 

In late 2022—following a fall in cryptocurrency prices and the collapse of many cryptocurrency exchanges and schemes such as FTX—concerns were raised about potential effects on Silvergate due to loss of deposits and credit exposure from SEN leverage, as well as potential ramifications of Silvergate's issues for the wider cryptocurrency ecosystem due to Silvergate's key role in it. Some short sellers raised the prospect of a bank run. The share price of Silvergate had fallen 89% from its November 2021 all-time-high to $25 by 5 December 2022, and its deposits fell to $9.8 billion. Silvergate has reported that it has adequate liquidity, that it only held FTX deposits, and that it was not exposed to FTX via lending. Senators Elizabeth Warren, Roger Marshall, and John Kennedy requested that the bank explain its relationship to FTX in December 2022. By December 2022 deposits at Silvergate had fallen to $3.8 billion.

On March 8, 2023, it was announced that Silvergate Bank would wind down its operations and liquidate.

References

1988 establishments in California
Banks of the United States
Companies formerly listed on the New York Stock Exchange
Cryptocurrency companies
Financial services companies established in 1988